Philip Dorn (born Hein van der Niet; 30 September 1901 – 9 May 1975), sometimes billed as Frits van Dongen (his screen name for German films prior to World War II), was a Dutch American actor who had a career in Hollywood. He was best known for portraying the father in the film I Remember Mama (1948).

Early years
Dorn was born in Scheveningen, The Hague, Netherlands in 1901 and made his stage début at age 14 in Dutch productions. He graduated from the Academy of Fine Arts and Architecture in Scheveningen. He served in Queen Wilhelmina's Royal Guards.

Career

Netherlands
Dorn made his debut under the name of Frits van Dongen in Op Hoop van Zegen (1934) directed by Alex Benno. He had lead roles in De Big van het Regiment (1935), The Cross-Patch (1935), Op Stap (1936), and Rubber (1936). He appeared on stage in Camille, Ghosts and Journey's End. He also toured Java with a theatrical company.

Germany
Dorn moved to Germany where he appeared in The Tiger of Eschnapur (1938) and its sequel The Indian Tomb (1938). He was also in Covered Tracks (1938) and The Journey to Tilsit (1939).

Hollywood
He moved to United States in August 1939, just a fortnight before World War II broke out. He went there at the urging of Henry Koster who had directed him in Holland.

Koster was at Universal and Dorn made three films for that studio: Enemy Agent (1940), Ski Patrol (1940), and Diamond Frontier (1940). Dorn went over to MGM where he had support roles in Escape (1940) and Ziegfeld Girl (1941).

Warners borrowed him to play the lead in Underground (1941). At MGM he had a support in Tarzan's Secret Treasure (1941) and they put him in a Dr. Kildare film, Born to be Bad, that had to be reshot when star Lew Ayres was fired due to being a conscientious objector. Dorn replaced him as a new doctor and the film was called Calling Dr. Gillespie (1942).

He had a support part in Random Harvest (1942) and was third billed in Reunion in France (1942).

20th Century Fox gave him the lead role in Chetniks! The Fighting Guerrillas (1943), playing Draža Mihailović. That studio kept him on to star in Paris After Dark (1943). At Warner Bros he was fourth billed in Passage to Marseille (1944). MGM gave him the lead in a B, Blonde Fever (1944). At Warners he starred in Escape in the Desert (1945), a remake of The Petrified Forest replacing Zachary Scott. At Republic, Dorn had the lead in I've Always Loved You (1946), an expensive musical.

In 1946, he appeared onstage  with Claire Trevor in The Big Two. He was going to feature in Singapore but had to pull out when he fell ill with pneumonia. He appeared in I Remember Mama (1948) at RKO, then did The Fighting Kentuckian (1949) with John Wayne at Republic. He had supporting roles in Spy Hunt (1950) at Universal and Sealed Cargo (1951) at RKO.

Return to Germany
Back in Germany, Dorn starred in Behind Monastery Walls (1952), Towers of Silence (1952), Dreaming Lips (1953) and Salto Mortale (1953).

Personal life
Dorn suffered from phlebitis, requiring surgery and causing a number of strokes. After an accident on stage, he retired in 1965 and spent the next 10 years of his life in his home in California.

He was married twice. His first wife (from 1921 to 1930) was Cornelia Maria Twilt. His second wife was Dutch actress Marianne van Dam. They were married from 1933 until his death in 1975.

Death
Dorn died of a heart attack at the Motion Picture & Television Country House and Hospital in Woodland Hills, Los Angeles, California, on 9 May 1975. He was 73 years old. He was survived by his wife and a daughter.

Partial filmography

as Frits van Dongen
Op hoop van zegen (1934) – Geert – haar zoon
De Big van het Regiment (1935) – Berkhage
The Cross-Patch or De Kribbebijter (1935) – Willy
Op Stap (1935) – George van Reen
Rubber (1936) – John van Laer
The Tiger of Eschnapur (1938) – Maharadscha von Eschnapur
Waltz Melodies (1938) or Immer wenn ich glücklich bin..! – Hans v. Waldenau
The Indian Tomb (1938) or Das indische Grabmal – Maharadscha von Eschnapur
Covered Tracks (1938) or Verwehte Spuren – Dr. Fernand Morot
The Jumping Jack or Der Hampelmann (1938) – Peter
The Journey to Tilsit or Die Reise nach Tilsit  (1939) – Endrik Settegast

as Philip Dorn
Enemy Agent (1940) – Doctor Jeffry Arnold
Ski Patrol (1940) – Lt. Viktor Ryder
Diamond Frontier (1940) – Jan Stafford De Winter
Escape (1940) – Dr. Ditten
Ziegfeld Girl (1941) – Franz Kolter
Underground (1941) – Eric Franken
Tarzan's Secret Treasure (1941) – Vandermeer
Calling Dr. Gillespie (1942) – Dr. John Hunter Gerniede
Random Harvest (1942) – Dr. Jonathan Benet
Reunion in France (1942) – Robert Cortot
Chetniks! The Fighting Guerrillas (1943) – Draza Mihailovic
Paris After Dark (1943) – Jean Blanchard
Passage to Marseille (1944) – Renault
Blonde Fever (1944) – Peter Donay
Escape in the Desert (1945) – Philip Artveld
I've Always Loved You (1946) – Leopold Goronoff
I Remember Mama (1948) – Papa
The Fighting Kentuckian (1949) – Col. Georges Geraud
Spy Hunt (1950) – Paul Kopel
Sealed Cargo (1951) – Konrad
Behind Monastery Walls (1952) – Thomas Holinka
The Unholy Intruders (1952, or Hinter Klostermauern) – Thomas Holinka

as Frits van Dongen
Towers of Silence or Türme des Schweigens (1952) – Captain de Vries
Dreaming Lips or Der träumende Mund (1953) – Michael
Salto Mortale (1953) – Cadenos (final film role)

Bibliography
 Ingo Schiweck/Hans Toonen  Maharadscha, Tschetnik, Kriegsheimkehrer : der Schauspieler Frits van Dongen oder Philip Dorn , Osnabrück 2003. 
 Hans Toonen  "Nederlands Eerste Hollywood-Ster
 Leo Deege  "From Nazi Occupied Holland to the Jungles of Vietnam-An Immigrant Story, Denver, Colorado, 2015.

References

External links

 
 Photographs of Philip Dorn

1901 births
1975 deaths
Dutch male film actors
Dutch male stage actors
Male actors from The Hague
Dutch expatriates in the United States
Metro-Goldwyn-Mayer contract players
Burials at Westwood Village Memorial Park Cemetery
20th-century German male actors
Expatriate male actors in the United States